Longileptoneta is a genus of spiders in the family Leptonetidae. It was first described in 2015 by Seo.

Species 
 it contains fourteen species, found in Asia:
 Longileptoneta buyongsan Lan, Zhao, Kim, Yoo, Lee & Li, 2021 – Korea
 Longileptoneta byeonsanbando Lan, Zhao, Kim, Yoo, Lee & Li, 2021 – Korea
 Longileptoneta gachangensis Seo, 2016 – Korea
 Longileptoneta gayaensis Seo, 2016 – Korea
 Longileptoneta gutan Wang & Li, 2020 – China
 Longileptoneta huanglongensis (Chen, Zhang & Song, 1982) – China
 Longileptoneta huangshan Wang & Li, 2020 – China
 Longileptoneta jangseongensis Seo, 2016 – Korea
 Longileptoneta jirisan Lan, Zhao, Kim, Yoo, Lee & Li, 2021 – Korea
 Longileptoneta shenxian Wang & Li, 2020 – China
 Longileptoneta songniensis Seo, 2015 (type) – Korea
 Longileptoneta weolakensis Seo, 2016 – Korea
 Longileptoneta yeren Wang & Li, 2020 – China
 Longileptoneta zhuxian Wang & Li, 2020 – China

References

Leptonetidae
Araneomorphae genera
Spiders of Asia